Fibraurea is a plant genus in the family Menispermaceae.

Species 
The Catalogue of Life lists the following:
Fibraurea darshanii Udayan & K.Ravik.: India (Karnataka, Kerala)
Fibraurea recisa Pierre: southern China, Indo-China (in Việt Nam hoàng đằng) - herbal
Fibraurea tinctoria Lour. (type species; synonyms: Fibraurea chloroleuca (Miers), Fibraurea fasciculata (Miers), Fibraurea laxa (Miers), Fibraurea trotteri (Watt), Fibraurea manipurensis Brace ex Diels): India, Indo-China, Malesia including Borneo.

No longer included:
 Fibraurea elliptica (Yamamoto) = Haematocarpus subpeltatus Merr.: (Luzon, Philippines).
 Fibraurea haematocarpus Hook.f. & Thomson = Haematocarpus validus (prev. H. thomsonii) Miers

References

External links
 * 

Flora of Indo-China
Menispermaceae genera
Menispermaceae